This is a list of Australian rules football-related statues.

Statues

See also

 List of individual match awards in the Australian Football League

Notes
  It does not include any busts, friezes, figurines, medallions, cameos or deathmasks.

References

Lists of visual art topics
Lists of public art in Australia
Statues
Sculptures of sports
Statues
Sports culture in Australia
Australian rules football statues
Australian football rules